Stephen McGinn (born 2 December 1988) is a Scottish footballer who plays as a midfielder for Scottish League One side Falkirk, where he is also club captain.

He began his career with St Mirren in his native Scotland, before moving south of the border to sign for English Championship side Watford where he spent three and a half years but was on the sidelines for over a year due to a knee injury and was loaned to Shrewsbury Town upon his return to fitness. He moved to Sheffield United in June 2013, leaving the club in February 2015. After a short stint with Dundee, McGinn then had 18 months with Wycombe Wanderers.

McGinn returned to St Mirren in January 2017 and helped them win promotion in 2017–18. He left St Mirren during the 2020 close season, and played for Hibernian and Morton during the 2020–21 season. He signed for Kilmarnock in June 2021.

He has also represented Scotland at under-19 and under-21 level.

Club career

St Mirren
Born in Glasgow and raised in Clydebank, McGinn started out at St Mirren FCBC (formerly the Football Club's Boys Club, now Youth Football Club), aged seven. He signed professional forms with St Mirren in July 2006, making his debut as a substitute on 1 January 2007 against Inverness CT. His first full appearance was in a 5–1 loss to Celtic on 20 January 2007, also scoring his first goal.

For the 2007–08 season, McGinn started on bench before making his first start of the season against Celtic at Parkhead on 8 December, he scored the opening goal in a 1–1 draw. His second goal of the season came as the only goal against Hearts. He made his first ever Scottish Cup appearance against Dumbarton on 12 January 2008, coming on in the 88 minute.

McGinn was named in the starting XI for the 2008–09 season, making a start against Celtic on the opening day. On 5 October 2008, he scored a vital goal against Rangers, where St Mirren won 1–0, the team's first home league win over Rangers in 22 years.

McGinn started the 2009–10 season on bench in the Scottish League Cup game but then went on to score on his first start of the season in a 2–1 loss to Hibernian on 15 August 2009. He continued his season with a brace against Kilmarnock at Rugby Park, where The Buddies came from behind to win 2–1.

Watford
McGinn signed for Watford in January 2010, for an undisclosed fee. He made his first Watford appearance as a substitute against Newcastle United on 27 February 2010, and finished the season making two starts and seven sub appearances.

The following season McGinn established himself as a first-team regular for Watford, missing just four games between August and the end of February, before damaging his knee ligaments in a 1–1 draw against Doncaster Rovers. He was ruled out for the rest of the season and underwent knee surgery. McGinn returned to fitness a year later, playing 45 minutes in a reserve game, insisting afterwards that he felt good and stronger than when he got injured.

In July 2012, McGinn signed a new contract to keep him at Vicarage Road for another year, with a one-year option held by the Hornets to extend the deal.

Having failed to make an appearance for Watford during the first half of the following season, in January McGinn signed for Shrewsbury Town on loan until the end of April. He scored his first goal for Shrewsbury in a 2–1 home loss to Sheffield United on 9 February. In June 2013, Watford announced that McGinn's contract would not be renewed and that he was due to be released as a free agent.

Sheffield United
Following his release from Watford, McGinn signed for League One side Sheffield United in June 2013, agreeing a two-year contract with the option of a third year. McGinn made his debut for the Blades in the opening fixture of the following season, in a 2–1 home win against Notts County. Having been allowed to join Dundee on loan on 30 January 2015, McGinn's contract was then cancelled by Sheffield United on 2 February 2015.

Dundee
On 30 January 2015, McGinn moved on loan to Dundee for the rest of the season. He joined his younger brother Paul at the Dens Park club. On 2 February 2015, he signed permanently for Dundee after his Sheffield United contract was cancelled by mutual consent.

Wycombe Wanderers
On 4 August 2015, McGinn joined League Two side, Wycombe Wanderers after a successful trial with the club. He signed a two-year contract, live on Sky Sports News HQ's 92Live programme. On 13 February 2016, McGinn scored his first goal for Wycombe, the only goal in a league win against Exeter City at Adams Park. On 25 January 2017, McGinn left Wycombe Wanderers after his contract was cancelled by mutual consent.

St Mirren (second spell)
McGinn signed an 18-month contract with St Mirren in January 2017, and played a major part in helping the club avoid relegation. He captained the club in season 2017–18, and was influential in helping Saints win the Scottish Championship title. After gaining promotion, McGinn then signed a two-year contract extension in April 2018. In June 2020, McGinn left Saints when his contract expired.

Hibernian
In September 2020, McGinn signed a contract with Hibernian that ran until the end of the 2020–21 season.

Greenock Morton (loan)
In March 2021, McGinn joined Greenock Morton on loan until the end of the season.

Kilmarnock
McGinn signed for Kilmarnock in June 2021. He would enjoy a successful season and win the Scottish Championship with Killie.

Falkirk
On 9 June 2022, McGinn signed for Scottish League One side Falkirk on a one-year deal with an option for a one-year extension.

International career
McGinn played for Scotland under-19s in a goalless draw against Slovakia in 2007, and marked his debut for the under-21s by scoring in a 5–2 win against Albania in April 2009. He went on to make a total of 8 appearances at under-21 level.

Personal life
Stephen's younger brothers John and Paul McGinn are also professional footballers. All three brothers have played for both St Mirren and Hibernian. McGinn's grandfather, Jack McGinn, is a former Celtic chairman and Scottish Football Association president.

Career statistics

Honours 
St Mirren

 Scottish Championship: 2017–18

Kilmarnock

 Scottish Championship: 2021–22

References

External links

Sheffield United FC Official Player Profile

1988 births
Living people
Footballers from Glasgow
Sportspeople from Clydebank
Footballers from West Dunbartonshire
Association football midfielders
St Mirren F.C. players
Watford F.C. players
Shrewsbury Town F.C. players
Sheffield United F.C. players
Dundee F.C. players
Hibernian F.C. players
Scottish people of Irish descent
Scotland youth international footballers
Scotland under-21 international footballers
Scottish Premier League players
Scottish Professional Football League players
English Football League players
Scottish footballers
Greenock Morton F.C. players
Kilmarnock F.C. players
Falkirk F.C. players